The following is a list of television reporters.

Argentina

Australia 
 Richard Carleton
 Naomi Robson
 Ray Martin
George Negus
 Ian Leslie
 Jana Wendt
 Charles Wooley
 Liam Bartlett
 Tara Brown
 Allison Langdon

Brazil 
Glória Maria
Ana Paula Padrão

Canada 

Ian Hanomansing
Lisa LaFlamme
Peter Mansbridge
Craig Oliver
Sandie Rinaldo
Lloyd Robertson

India 
Arnab Goswami

Japan 
Elina Arai

Mexico

Pakistan

Palestine 
 Tareq Ayyoub
 Muhammad al-Qiq

Philippines

Poland

Puerto Rico

Russia 
Svetlana Pesotskaya

Spain 
Leticia Ortiz (Princess of Asturias), formerly on TVE

Trinidad & Tobago 
Sampson Nanton

Turkey

United Kingdom

United States

National newscasts

Local newscasts

Uruguay 
Pedro Sevcec

Venezuela 
Oscar Yanes

See also 
Newscaster

References 

!
Television reporters